Albertina "Berta" Iosifovna Kolokoltseva (born October 29, 1937) is a Russian speed skater who competed for the Soviet Union in the 1964 Winter Olympics, and won the bronze medal in the 1500 metres event.

References

1937 births
Living people
Soviet female speed skaters
Olympic speed skaters of the Soviet Union
Speed skaters at the 1964 Winter Olympics
Olympic bronze medalists for the Soviet Union
Olympic medalists in speed skating
Russian female speed skaters
Medalists at the 1964 Winter Olympics